Hockey Club Lipovci, commonly referred to as HC Lipovci or simply Lipovci is Slovenian field hockey team and is based in Lipovci, Slovenia. The club was founded in 1965, making it the oldest active field hockey club in Slovenia.

History
Lipovci is a village with a population of about 1,000 people and is situated in the north-eastern part of Slovenia in the middle of the region called Prekmurje and is best known for field hockey. 
Since 1965 till 1991, the club played in the highest level in former Yugoslavia but never finished on top. At that time club won three junior Yugoslav Championships (U-18). After Slovenia became independent in 1991, the club built an artificial field and the new era in the club's history began. HC Lipovci is today known as the all-time best field hockey club in Slovenia. Last two decades were the best in club history and club became serial champions. HC Lipovci is today known as the all-time best field hockey club in Slovenia.

In the past, the club was also known as HC Lek Lipovci and HC Pliva Lipovci due to sponsorship reasons.

Honours

25 times Slovenian field hockey champions
12 times Slovenian Cup winners
16 times Slovenian indoor hockey champions
7 times Central European Interleague Champions
1 time Indoor Central European Interleague Champions
1st place European Club Championship Challenge - Brest  2004
1st place European Club Championship Challenge - Zagreb  2006
1st place EuroHockey Indoor Club Challenge II - Gabrovo  2008
1st place EuroHockey Club Challenge III - Bratislava  2008
1st place EuroHockey Club Challenge II - Lousada  2009
1st place EuroHockey Club Challenge II - Athens  2012
1st place EuroHockey Indoor Club Challenge II - Kanjiža  2014

References

External links
Official website 

Slovenian field hockey clubs
Field hockey clubs established in 1965
1965 establishments in Slovenia